Gorgopotamos is a small village located at the foot of Mount Grammos of Epirus (Greece). It is surrounded by forest and the small river of Gorgopotamos runs right next to it.
Gorgopotamos is part of the municipal unit of Mastorochoria of Ioannina regional unit, North-West Greece. Its location is very close to the Greek-Albanian borders. In 2011 it had a population of 29.
Some Albanians from Gorgopotamos would work as masons in Zagori, but would usually stay briefly and rarely settled there.

Bibliography

Populated places in Ioannina (regional unit)